Kibiwott Munge (born c. 1994) is a Kenyan politician who was elected to represent the Lembus Perkera ward in Baringo town.

References

Kenyan politicians
Living people
People from Baringo County
Year of birth missing (living people)